This is a list of political parties in Singapore, including existing and historical ones. The earliest political parties were established in the lead-up to Singapore first Legislative Council elections in 1948. Singapore is a republic. While the country has a multi-party system, the dominant political party have often been the People's Action Party since 1965, along with the main opposition party, the Workers' Party. Minority governments are uncommon, as elections have not resulted in a hung parliament since independence.

Legislative power is vested in parliament, which consists of the president as its head and a single chamber whose members are elected by popular vote. The role of the president as the head of state has been, historically, largely ceremonial although the constitution was amended in 1991 to give the president some veto powers in a few key decisions such as the use of the national reserves, as well as the appointment of key judiciary, civil service and Singapore Armed Forces posts. They also exercise powers over national security matters.

Singapore has consistently been rated as the most least-corrupt country in Asia and globally amongst the top five by Transparency International's Corruption Perceptions Index, and the degree of accountability and transparency is reflected in the public's high level of satisfaction with the political institutions. Thomas Friedman of the New York Times also considers the country's civil service to be one of the most efficient and uncorrupt bureaucracies in the world, with a high standard of discipline and accountability. The World Bank's governance indicators have also rated Singapore highly on rule of law, control of corruption and government effectiveness.

History

Pre-independence
Amongst the oldest parties, the Malay Union, traced its history back to 14 May 1926, was initially a non-political association as the party only participated in the 1955 election. The Progressive Party and Labour Party, both established in the late 1940s, were some of the pioneering local establishments, with the PP the only party to contest in the first elections in 1948, and the LP coming on board in 1951. By 1955, the fledgling British colony had seven parties contesting, and reached a pinnacle of 13 parties in 1959. A total of three parties were established in the 1940s, 12 in the 1950s and five in the 1960s.

Post-independence

20th century
Post-independence Singapore saw the dominance of the People's Action Party, which first came into power in 1959. On 16 May 1960, a new Societies Ordinance was passed, and in December 1966, local parties were forbidden from being affiliated to foreign ones. This directly impacted the handful of small parties with links to Malaysia, most of which renamed themselves and/or cut formal foreign ties. The PAP's dominance stemming from Singapore's economic advancement further weakened the smaller opposition parties, with a majority of Singaporeans voting for the PAP in subsequent elections. To date, 13 parties have officially dissolved, mostly through mergers with other parties.

Still, new parties continued to be established. Seven new parties were formed in the 1970s (including the Justice Party, Singapore and the United Front, the preprocessor of today's Democratic Progressive Party), two in the 1980s, two in the 1990s, three in the 2000s, and six in the 2010s. The newest party to be registered is Singapore United Party, on 24 December 2020. There are therefore a total of 30 registered political parties today, of which ten have never contested in an election.

21st century
Over the years, alliances between political parties existed, however short-lived. Presently, only one functioning multi-party alliance, the Singapore Democratic Alliance, which was formed on 3 July 2001, initially composed of the Singapore People's Party (SPP), National Solidarity Party, Pertubuhan Kebangsaan Melayu Singapura and the Justice Party, Singapore, with the SPP being the lead party. The vision was to bring all opposition parties under one banner to counter the PAP's dominance, but it was met with limited success due to opposition infighting. The NSP left the alliance in 2007, and in 2010, the SPP itself left when there was internal disagreements over the SPP's attempts to bring in the newly formed Reform Party.

After the 2015 Singaporean general election, 4 new political parties were formed, Progress Singapore Party (PSP), Red Dot United, Peoples Voice (PV) and Singapore United Party (SUP). Peoples Voice was formed by Lim Tean in 2018 after he resigned from the National Solidarity Party in 2017.

PSP was founded in 2019 by former People's Action Party Member of Parliament Tan Cheng Bock and 11 other members. Former Progress Singapore Party members Ravi Philemon and Michelle Lee, together with other former members of other political parties submitted an application to form the Red Dot United to the Registry of Societies.

Another party was formed out of former members of the Reform Party in the aftermath of the 2020 Singaporean general election, called the Singapore United Party.

Legislation
Under the current legislation, all political parties (termed "Political Associations") must be registered under the Societies Act. As such, the following rules pertaining to political associations apply:
 All members of political parties must be Singaporean citizens.
 Political Association must not be affiliated or connected with any organisation outside Singapore. The fact that a political association uses a name or symbol which is the same as that of an organisation outside Singapore shall be deemed to be sufficient evidence that the political association has an affiliation or connection with that organisation.
The government has the power to dissolve the party if it contravenes the above rules, or any other rule applicable to all forms of registered societies.

Under the Political Donations Act which came into force on 15 February 2001, Political Associations are also barred from accepting any donation in cash or kind from impermissible donors, or from anonymous donors where the value exceeds S$5,000. The government announced that it was to "prevent foreigners from interfering in domestic politics through the financial support for any association's cause", and cited an example of a case in 1959 when S$700,000 was sent to Chew Swee Kee, then Education Minister from the Singapore People's Alliance by a "neighbouring intelligence service in a "black operation" against the interests of Singapore". Another case was also cited pertaining to foreign financial support for Francis Seow of the Workers' Party in 1988. 

The People's Action Party donated $20,000 to Australian political parties through (Singtel-owned) Optus in 2010, although the motives and details of the donation remain unverified.

Political parties
There have been a total of 43 political parties (not including Malaysia's parties, those contested in both Malaysia and Singapore elections, or those which contested during Singapore's merger with Malaysia) in Singapore.

 Party or Alliance active   Party or Alliance active, but collated to another party or alliance   Party or Alliance dissolved   Party or Alliance registered, but is yet to contest   Party or Alliance's status unknown

Current political parties

Shirt colours
The candidates and supporters of the various political parties tend to wear the following shirt colours while making their rounds in various wards or campaigning.

Past political parties

 The tally does not include city council elections, by-elections, Malaysian parliamentary elections or presidential elections (the latter which requires nonpartisan candidacy).
 The party was contested under the coalition of Singapore People's Party (SPP).
 The party was contested under the coalition of Singapore Democratic Alliance (SDA).
 The party was contested under the coalition of United People's Front (UPF).

Other defunct parties
Malayan Communist Party
Malayan Democratic Union (dissolved in 1948)
Singapore Socialist Party (merged to form Labour Front)

See also
 Politics of Singapore
 Elections in Singapore
 List of political parties by country
 Non-constituency Member of Parliament
 Constituencies of Singapore

References

External links
Political parties in Singapore

 
 
Singapore
Political parties
Political parties
Singapore